Craig F. Walker is an American photojournalist. In 2010, Walker won the Pulitzer Prize for Feature Photography "for his intimate portrait of a teenager who joins the Army at the height of insurgent violence in Iraq, poignantly searching for meaning and manhood. In 2012 he won again the same prize in the category “Feature Photography”" for his photodocumentary "Welcome Home". He is on staff of Boston Globe.

Background
After growing up in York, Pennsylvania, Walker attended the Rhode Island School of Photography, graduating in 1986. He worked for Marlboro Enterprise and the Berkshire Eagle prior to taking a position with The Denver Post in 1998. He has covered national and international stories. In 2004, he won first place from the National Press Photographers Association for a photographic series on child camel jockeys in Kuwait.

Pulitzers
Walker was inspired to embark on the series that netted him his Pulitzer by a conversation amongst editors wondering what kind of person, in 2007, would sign up for the military knowing he would be going to war. Walker spent over two years photographing American teenager Ian Fisher in his transition from high school student to soldier. Published in September 2009, "Ian Fisher: American Soldier" earned a grand prize in the 2009 "Photos of the Year" competition hosted by Editor & Publisher before garnering for Walker the 2010 Pulitzer Prize. The series includes not only photographs, but also video and multimedia. The series also earned The Hillman Prize for Photojournalism, sharing the award with "Below the Line: Childhood Poverty in Colorado", also published by The Denver Post. 

In 2012, Walker won a second Pulitzer for Feature Photography  "for his compassionate chronicle of an honorably discharged veteran, home from Iraq and struggling with a severe case of post-traumatic stress."

References

External links
"Captured: Ian Fisher : American Soldier", Denver Post blog, Sep 10, 2009

American photojournalists
Pulitzer Prize for Feature Photography winners
Place of birth missing (living people)
1967 births
Living people
People from York, Pennsylvania
Journalists from Pennsylvania
Photographers from Pennsylvania